The Big Adventure is an Australian reality television series that premiered on the Seven Network on 19 October 2014, and is hosted by Jason Dundas.

Show details
A grid of 25 squares was set up, 12 of which contained keys. Contestants competed in a series of tasks for the right to dig for a key. Each episode one contestant would dig and one would (usually) be eliminated. In the last episode, four remaining contestants used their keys to open chests, one of which contained the prize money.

The show premiered on Sunday, 19 October, at 6:30pm, and then filled the timeslots vacated by the recently concluded season of The X Factor Australia for two weeks before disappointing ratings saw the show revert to airing once a week, taking effect on 9 November 2014.

The prize money offered was equal to the highest single prize ever given away on Australian television (having been twice awarded on the Nine Network's Who Wants To Be A Millionaire?, and once as the grand prize on Network Ten's Big Brother Australia for its 2004 edition). This was later beaten by Million Dollar Minute contestant Andrew Skarbek, who won $1,016,000.

Contestants

Results chart

Key:
 – Member of Blue Team
 – Member of Orange Team

Episodes

Episode 1

Island Race: The team of twelve were to split into two teams (orange and blue) and were asked to row to an island not far from their starting destination. Before starting, each team had to build their boats using materials found on the beach nearby. Upon arriving on the island, each team would then be required to carry their barrels inland, and ultimately, to the centre of the island where the 5 x 5 grid was located. Whichever team arrived first would win the challenge and thus move further to having the right to dig within the 5 x 5 square grid the following night. That team was the orange team, who were later informed that they would have to compete in an individual challenge against one another for the right to dig in the treasure grid.

True Colours: The players were asked to traverse a course off shore and match the flags, as seen from a far distance, on the structure. As the winning team from the previous challenge, each player from the Orange team, except for Paula who injured her ankle shortly after the first challenge the previous day, were to run across a bridge, grab a telescope, view the six flags from the far distance, return to the platform, jump into the water, find the six flags then try to memorise the pattern that they had seen through the telescope. Whichever player was first to win the challenge (that is, correctly reprising the pattern that they saw through the telescope) would then have the right to dig through the treasured grid at the end of the episode.

Episode 2

Episode 3

Episode 4

Blind Trust: The players had to choose one player to be blindfolded, and the rest of the team had to guide him or her through a course. First, the blindfolded player had to swim through the water, guided by the rest of the team, towards a buoy, retrieve a wooden handle on the water floor and return it to the pontoon. Next, the blindfolded player had to navigate through a higher part of the course, retrieve a second wooden handle, then play a maze where they had to roll the balls through to the holes at certain dead ends.

Episode 5

Episode 6

See also

 Australian Survivor

References

External links 
 Yahoo news

Puzzle hunts
Seven Network original programming
2010s Australian reality television series
2014 Australian television series debuts
2014 Australian television series endings
Television shows filmed in Fiji
Television shows set in Fiji